Sprung rhythm is a poetic rhythm designed to imitate the rhythm of natural speech. It is constructed from feet in which the first syllable is stressed and may be followed by a variable number of unstressed syllables. The British poet Gerard Manley Hopkins said he discovered this previously unnamed poetic rhythm in the natural patterns of English in folk songs, spoken poetry, Shakespeare, Milton, et al. He used diacritical marks on syllables to indicate which should be stressed in cases "where the reader might be in doubt which syllable should have the stress" (acute, e.g. shéer) and which syllables should be pronounced but not stressed (grave, e.g., gleanèd).

Some critics believe he merely coined a name for poems with mixed, irregular feet, like free verse. However, while sprung rhythm allows for an indeterminate number of syllables to a foot, Hopkins was very careful to keep the number of feet per line consistent across each individual work, a trait that free verse does not share. Sprung rhythm may be classed as a form of accentual verse, as it is stress-timed, rather than syllable-timed, and while sprung rhythm did not become a popular literary form, Hopkins's advocacy did assist in a revival of accentual verse more generally.

Example
The Windhover

To Christ our Lord

I caught this morning morning's minion, king-
    dom of daylight's dauphin, dapple-dawn-drawn Falcon, in his riding
    Of the rolling level underneath him steady air, and striding
High there, how he rung upon the rein of a wimpling wing
In his ecstasy! then off, off forth on swing,
    As a skate's heel sweeps smooth on a bow-bend: the hurl and gliding
    Rebuffed the big wind. My heart in hiding
Stirred for a bird, – the achieve of, the mastery of the thing!

Brute beauty and valour and act, oh, air, pride, plume, here
    Buckle! AND the fire that breaks from thee then, a billion
Times told lovelier, more dangerous, O my chevalier!
     
   No wonder of it: shéer plód makes plough down sillion
Shine, and blue-bleak embers, ah my dear,
    Fall, gall themselves, and gash gold-vermilion.

—Gerard Manley Hopkins (1844–1889)

Scansion

Since Hopkins considers that feet always begin in a stressed syllable in sprung rhythm, for a scansion it is enough to specify which syllables are stressed. One proposed scansion of this poem is

I cáught this mórning mórning's mínion, kíng-
    dom of dáylight's dáuphin, dapple-dáwn-drawn Fálcon, in his ríding
    Of the rólling level úndernéath him steady áir, and stríding
Hígh there, how he rúng upon the réin of a wímpling wíng
In his écstasy! then óff, óff fórth on swíng,
    As a skáte's heel sweeps smóoth on a bów-bend: the húrl and glíding
    Rebúffed the bíg wínd. My héart in híding
Stírred for a bírd, – the achíeve of, the mástery of the thíng!

Brute béauty and válour and áct, oh, air, príde, plume, hére
    Buckle! ÁND the fíre that bréaks from thee thén, a bíllion
Tímes told lóvelier, more dángerous, Ó my chevalíer!
     
   No wónder of it: shéer plód makes plóugh down síllion
Shíne, and blúe-bleak émbers, áh my déar,
    Fall, gáll themsélves, and gásh góld-vermílion.

The scansion of this poem is discussed in Poems of Gerard Manley Hopkins. Authorities disagree about the scansion.

See also
 Grail Psalms

Notes

References

Poetic rhythm
Sonnet studies
Victorian poetry